Latvia–Spain relations are the bilateral and diplomatic relations between Latvia and Spain. Relationships are based on the countries' membership in the European Union and NATO.

Facilities 

Latvia has an embassy in Madrid and consulates in Barcelona, Bilbao, Marbella, Seville and Valencia. Formal representation of Spain in Latvia is limited to the embassy office in Riga.

Diplomatic relations 
Historical relations between Spain and Latvia began during the first period of independence, and were re-established in October 1991.

Since Latvia's entry into the EU and NATO, relations with Spain have seen positive developments, including the opening of the Spanish Embassy in Riga in 2004, and Latvia's Diplomatic Representation in Madrid.

In 2009 Latvian representatives visited  Spain, which culminated a first stage of bilateral approach.

Cooperation 
While Latvia is not subject to Official Spanish Development Assistance, cooperation in the cultural and educational field is growing. Several Spanish universities have signed agreements with counterparts in Latvia, and the number of Erasmus students in Spain continues to grow. The AECID finances two lectorates in each University of Riga.

Spanish artists travel to Riga to participate in major dance or music festivals, as part of Latvia's cultural programming.

The Latvian Academy of Culture teaches a degree of specialization in Spanish language and culture. The University of Latvia teaches a master's degree in Romanesque Studies, both with the support of the AECID's lecturer program.

See also 
 Foreign relations of Latvia    
 Foreign relations of Spain

References 

 
Spain
Latvia